The 1962 Gael Linn Cup is a representative competition for elite level participants in the women's team field sport of camogie, was won by Leinster, who defeated Ulster in the final, played at Casement Park Belfast.

Arrangements
Ulster defeated Connacht 2–9 to 3–4 at Carrickmacross. Leinster defeated Munster 7–3 to 5–5 in one of the best matches of the year. Referee Kathleen Griffin played 20 minutes in the second half of the final at Casement Park instead of the regulation 25 minutes, with the score standing at Leinster 7–2, Ulster 5–3.
 A hastily convened meeting of the Central Council members who were present allowed the result to stand and a subsequent Ulster appeal was rejected.Agnes Hourigan wrote in the Irish Press: Miss Griffin stated that she had played, by here reckoning, the full 25 minutes of the second half, and the Central Council members present then confirmed Leinster as champions.

Final stages

|}

References

External links
 Camogie Association

1962 in camogie
1962
1962 in Northern Ireland sport